Besednoye is a rural locality (a village) in Staroselskoye Rural Settlement, Vologodsky District, Vologda Oblast, Russia. The population was 11 as of 2002.

Geography 
Besednoye is located 47 km west of Vologda (the district's administrative centre) by road. Svetilki is the nearest rural locality.

References 

Rural localities in Vologodsky District